The Tucker Maxon School is an inclusive educational institution based in Portland, Multnomah County, Oregon, United States, which assists children who are deaf or hard of hearing, as well as children with typical hearing, in a co-enrolled, mutually beneficial classroom environment. The school's mission is to teach "deaf and hearing children to listen, talk, learn, and achieve excellence together".  Tucker Maxon is a 501c(3) non-profit corporation governed by a 14-member Board of Directors and managed by a 30+ member staff and faculty.

History
Tucker Maxon School was founded in 1947 by Stoel Rives attorney Paul Boley, a pioneer in oral education and related technology, and five Portland families who dreamed of providing their deaf children with the gift of speech.  Boley’s daughter Barbara Ann contracted meningitis and lost her hearing at the age of 18 months. Initially, the Boleys enrolled their daughter in the preschool program at Portland’s Hosford Public School for Deaf Children. At Hosford, he was introduced to instructor Alice Maxon, who believed "Deaf children can talk”.

Boley toured oral schools in the Midwest and on the East Coast, and was particularly impressed with the Wright School, Helen Keller’s Alma mater.  At the suggestion of the president of the Wright School, Boley began to dream of opening a small school in Portland where his daughter and other deaf children could learn to speak. 
. At Boley’s request, the president of Cascades Plywood Corporation, Max Tucker, sponsored the school during its earliest years, and made sizable donations which allowed Tucker Maxon to build and open its first school building in 1953. The building was designed by architect Pietro Belluschi. In 1963, Tucker Maxon opened their second building with classrooms, offices, and a gymnasium.

In 2014, the school began Tucker Arts Camp that focuses on art, music, dance, sculpture, film, photography and the culinary arts each summer. The camp focuses on a different country or continent each week for 8 weeks. In 2015, 2017 and 2018, Tucker Maxon was named one of the Top 100 Nonprofits in Oregon

Educational Approach
Tucker Maxon is one of approximately 40 schools that teach children who are deaf to speak.  Tucker Maxon began co-enrolling students who were not deaf or hard of hearing in the mid-1980s, when it leased space to a neighborhood preschool.  Tucker Maxon formally adopted co-enrollment in 2002, when it extended enrollment to include students with typical hearing, and became one of the first schools in the country to co-enroll students with hearing loss and those with typical hearing. At Tucker Maxon students with hearing loss do not use sign language, even though sign language acquisition has been proven to be critical for the cognitive and psychosocial functioning of deaf children; instead, they use assistive technologies such as cochlear implants with FM transmitters and hearing aids, under the guidance of trained professionals, and they listen, talk, play, and learn alongside their hearing peers.

Tucker Maxon offers classrooms with an average student to teacher ratio of 8:1 to allow for individual attention that ensures each child is developing appropriate language and academic skills. Students become comfortable using technology with interactive digital whiteboards and Chromebook laptop computers.

In 2013, Tucker Maxon was evaluated by OPTION Schools Inc. and exceeded the organization’s standards for Listening and Spoken Language schools.

Programs and Services
Tucker Maxon is the only Listening and Spoken Language school in Oregon. Tucker Maxon offers:
 Highly qualified teaching staff — almost all have master's degrees
 Specialized instruction for children who are deaf or hard of hearing, birth through 5th grade
 Direct Early Intervention services for infants and toddlers (birth to 3) who are deaf or hard of hearing with their families
 Instruction for children with typical hearing, preschool through 5th grade
 Sound-field speaker systems to help students access the teacher's verbal instructions
 On-site speech therapy and audiology services
 Small class sizes with individual attention
 Physical Education five days per week
 Weekly art and music classes
 Outdoor play where children creatively explore the playground equipment and natural resources
 Extended Care Programs offering before and after school care
 A focus on social and emotional intelligence
 Opportunities for children to value differences and help one another

Campus
Tucker Maxon School is located on SE Holgate Blvd, in the Reed neighborhood of inner Southeast Portland. An organic vegetable garden grows on the back of the property where children can participate in planting, cultivating, and harvesting. Chickens lay eggs. Goats provide an endless amount of fascination and amusement.
A large playground provides opportunities for creative play, and a large tree house provides an outdoor classroom in the sky. Indoors, children love the full-sized gymnasium with rock climbing wall. Preschoolers learn in Smith-Bauder Hall, just a short walk across the playground to Tucker Hall, the main building where Elementary students attend class.

Affiliations
The Tucker Maxon School is affiliated with the Oregon Health Sciences University's Oregon Hearing Research Center (OHRC).

References

External links

Schools for the deaf in the United States
Education in Portland, Oregon
Private elementary schools in Oregon
Schools in Portland, Oregon
1947 establishments in Oregon